WELZ is an A.M. radio station licensed to operate by the Federal Communications Commission during daytime hours only on 1460 kilohertz.  It is owned by Zoo-Bel Broadcasting, LLC.  Its community of license is Belzoni, Mississippi.  Zoo-Bel also owns WBYP in Belzoni.

External links

ELZ (AM)
ELZ